Remmer is a surname. Notable people with the surname include:

 Anders Remmer, Danish electronic musician
 Christoffer Remmer (born 1993), Danish association footballer
 Hans Remmer (1920–1944), Luftwaffe pilot
 Karen Remmer, American political scientist

See also
 Remmers